Let's Go Collegiate is a 1941 American musical comedy film directed by Jean Yarbrough and produced by Monogram Pictures. It was released as Farewell to Fame in the United Kingdom.

Plot summary 
Frankie (Frankie Darro) is the coxswain on the rowing team at Rawley University. His friend Tad (Jackie Moran) is a stroke on the crew, president of the Kappa Psi Delta fraternity, and leader of the campus swing band. Rawley's administrators are eagerly awaiting the arrival of renowned athletic star Bob Terry. Tad learns that Terry has been drafted to the army and will not be joining the crew, nor will he be attending the party welcoming him. Frankie and Tad don't have the hearts to tell their girlfriends Midge (Gale Storm) and Bess (Marcia Mae Jones), who have worked hard to prepare the party, and instead look for a replacement for Bob for the evening. They find truck driver Hercules "Herk" Bevans (Frank Sully) loading a safe onto his truck singlehanded. After some convincing, Herk reluctantly accepts the offer to pose as Bob. Herk enjoys the party and flirts with both Bess and Midge, using guttersnipe slang in  contrast to the actual students. He decides to stay on campus and join the team as "Bob Terry," despite his aversion to boats. Frankie cures Herk's nautical nausea with seasick pills.

The fraternity gang of Frankie, Tad, Buck (Keye Luke), and Jeff (Mantan Moreland) work frantically behind the scenes to keep the fake Terry on the team. They coach him not to make social errors with his uncultured speech, and they tutor him in his homework so thoroughly that they themselves risk failing their college courses. Bess breaks up with Tad and lets him know that she is going to marry "Bob Terry." Midge breaks up with Frankie as well, giving the same reason.

On the day of the regatta, Bess and Midge learn of their mutual engagement to Herk. During the race, Frankie runs out of seasick pills and gives Herk moth balls instead. This energizes Herk tremendously and the crew wins. After the race, Herk is arrested for bank robbery. Frankie and Tad reunite with their girlfriends, and explain that "Bob Terry" has been drafted. As Herk is led away, an announcer explains that Terry will be spending the next few years "in federal service."

Cast
Frankie Darro as Frankie Monahan
Marcia Mae Jones as Bess Martin
Jackie Moran as Tad
Keye Luke as Buck Wing
Mantan Moreland as Jeff
Frank Sully as Hercules "Herk" Bevans
Gale Storm as Midge
Billy Griffith as Prof. Whitaker
Barton Yarborough as Coach Walsh
Frank Faylen as Speed
Marguerite Whitten as Malvina
Paul Maxey as Bill Miller
Tristram Coffin as Slugger Wilson
Gene O'Donnell as Announcer
Jackie Moran's Band as Orchestra
Marvin Jones as Homer (uncredited)

Soundtrack
 Gale Storm - "Look What You've Done to Me"
 Jackie Moran, Marcia Mae Jones, Mantan Moreland, and Marguerite Whitten - "Let's Do a Little Dreamin'"
 Gale Storm - "Sweet Sixteen"

Reception
Let's Go Collegiate received unusually good notices when first released. Motion Picture Herald raved, "This comedy with music, produced on a budget which wouldn't get the camera started on a so-called major lot, outstrips [most B pictures] in point of freshness, spirit, liveliness, humor, and the essentials of entertainment generally... Millions have been spent on less worthwhile college plots with a fraction of the results obtained with this one."

References

External links

1941 films
1941 musical comedy films
1941 romantic comedy films
American musical comedy films
American romantic comedy films
American romantic musical films
American black-and-white films
1940s English-language films
Films set in universities and colleges
Rowing films
Monogram Pictures films
1940s romantic musical films
Films directed by Jean Yarbrough
1940s American films